CGSM may refer to: 

 Canadian Geospace Monitoring
 Consortium for Graduate Study in Management
 A 'consignment of geriatric shoe manufacturers' - a euphemism for 'a load of old cobblers' from the UK television comedy series Yes Minister.